"Go the Distance" is a song from Disney's 1997 animated feature film, Hercules. It was written by composer Alan Menken and lyricist David Zippel, and originally recorded by American actor Roger Bart in his film role as the singing voice of Hercules. American singer-songwriter Michael Bolton recorded a pop version of the song for the film's end credits, which was also included on his eleventh studio album All That Matters (1997). In the Spanish version, the song is performed by Hercules voice actor Ricky Martin, both in the movie and in the credits; this version is included on Martin's album Vuelve. Both the song and its reprise featured in a stage production of Hercules, performed upon the Disney Wonder during 2007/2008.

Production

"Go the Distance" was one of two songs written for Hercules in the film, the second being "Shooting Star", which failed to make the final cut. However, "Shooting Star" is included on the Hercules soundtrack CD, sung by Boyzone. The score for the original version of the song can be found in the Alan Menken Songbook.

Critical reception
Christian Clemmensen of Filmtracks deemed "Go the Distance" to be Herculess "only redeeming song" out of an unsatisfactory soundtrack. However, he criticized Roger Bart's version for his "whiny voice", which Clemmensen expressed had a tone that is "remarkably irritating", while he considered Michael Bolton's pop version to be "finely tuned".

The book Ways of Being Male felt that the phrase "go the distance" is a prime example of the way themes are "couched in the language of sport and competition" throughout the film. Den of Geek deemed it "one of Disney's great anthems/motivational mantras for all aspiring athletes and deities." MoviePilot suggests that the shooting star during "Go the Distance" is actually Aladdin and Jasmine's magic carpet ride. The Globe and Mail likened it to Duddy's Leaving St. Urbain Street, while BoingBoing compared it to Pocahontass "Just Around the Riverbend". Vulture deemed it "inspiring".

Awards and chart placings
The song was nominated for the Academy Award for Best Original Song and the Golden Globe Award for Best Original Song. Both awards, however, went to "My Heart Will Go On", a song by Celine Dion from Titanic, a film directed by James Cameron. "Go the Distance" peaked at #24 on the Billboard Hot 100 chart and went to #1 on the Hot Adult Contemporary Tracks chart, Bolton's ninth song to top this chart.

Versions
Film version
The song was recorded by American actor Roger Bart in his film role as the singing voice of Hercules.

"Go the Distance" is performed in the film by Hercules (age 15) who possesses god-like strength and finds it increasingly hard to fit in with his peers. The song serves as Hercules' prayer to the Gods to help him find where he truly belongs. His prayers are answered, as he is revealed to be the long-lost son of Zeus, king of the gods. Hercules is also told that he must become a true hero in order to rejoin his father on Mount Olympus. The number is later reprised when Hercules sets off on his quest to become a true hero, proclaiming that he wants to "go the distance" in order to prove himself.

Michael Bolton version

American singer-songwriter Michael Bolton recorded a pop version of the song for the film's end credits. This version, produced by Walter Afanasieff and Bolton himself, was later included on Bolton's eleventh studio album, All That Matters (1997). Bolton's version was released as a commercial single by Walt Disney Records on May 20, 1997. It peaked at number 24 on the US Billboard Hot 100.

The accompanying music video for Bolton's version was directed by Dani Jacobs. Sections of it were filmed in the Great Hall of the Brooklyn Museum and feature Bolton performing the song, intercut with scenes from Hercules. Vocal Spectrum did a cover version of this Bolton's version.

Credits and personnel
 Michael Bolton – lead vocals
 Walter Afanasieff – keyboards, synth bass
 Dan Shea – additional keyboards, computer programming
 David Gleeson – Synclavier programming
 Dann Huff – guitar, guitar solo
 Michael Landau – guitar
 John Robinson – drums
 Jeremy Lubbock – orchestra arrangement and conductor
 Jesse Levy – orchestra contractor
 Sandy Griffith – backing vocals
 Claytoven Richardson – backing vocals
 Jeanie Tracy – backing vocals

Charts

Ricky Martin version

Ricky Martin recorded a Spanish-language version of "Go the Distance" from Hercules soundtrack, called "No Importa la Distancia" (English: "No Matter the Distance"). It was released as a single on July 1, 1997. Later, it was included on Martin's 1998 album Vuelve. A music video was also released. The song reached number ten on the Latin Pop Songs in the United States. Martin's version was met with unfavorable reactions from music critics. AllMusic's Jose F. Promis called "No Importa la Distancia" "pure schmaltz" In the San Antonio Express-News, Ramiro Burr found "No Importa la Distancia" to be "sappy", while The Dallas Morning News editor Mario Tarradell criticized the song as an "unwelcome dose of sugary pap".

Charts

Formats and track listingsEuropean CD single"No Importa la Distancia" performed by Ricky Martin – 4:51
"Já Não Há Distancia" performed by Ricky Martin – 4:45European CD maxi-single'''
"No Importa la Distancia" performed by Ricky Martin – 4:51
"Já Não Há Distancia" performed by Ricky Martin – 4:45
"Go the Distance" (Cast Version) performed by Roger Bart – 3:13

We Love Disney
The song was covered in different languages for the series We Love Disney by:
Harrison Craig for We Love Disney, Australia in 2014
David Bisbal for We Love Disney, Latin America in 2016

Certifications

Other appearances
In April 2020 during COVID-19 pandemic, Disney Broadway Stars performs Go the Distance'' while self-isolating.

See also
List of Billboard Adult Contemporary number ones of 1997

References

1997 songs
1990s ballads
1997 singles
Columbia Records singles
Disney Renaissance songs
Disney songs
Hercules (franchise)
Lucas Grabeel songs
Michael Bolton songs
Pop ballads
Ricky Martin songs
Rock ballads
Song recordings produced by Walter Afanasieff
Songs with music by Alan Menken
Songs with lyrics by David Zippel
Songs written for animated films
Sony Discos singles
Walt Disney Records singles
Song recordings produced by Alan Menken